Glinna  is a village in the administrative district of Gmina Stare Czarnowo, within Gryfino County, West Pomeranian Voivodeship, in north-western Poland.

For the history of the region, see History of Pomerania.

The village has a population of 340 and is the location of a German War Cemetery with about 13,000 graves

References

Glinna